The list of ship launches in 1871 includes a chronological list of some ships launched in 1871.


See also

1871
Ship launches